D51 or D-51 may refer to:
 D-51, a Japanese popular music group
 JNR Class D51, a Japanese steam locomotive
 HMS Atheling (D51), a 1942 British Royal Navy escort aircraft carrier
 HMS Chevron (R51), a 1945 British Royal Navy destroyer, later re-designated D51
 D51 road (Croatia), a state road
 the ICD-10 code for vitamin B12 deficiency anemia